The Ilmenspitze is a mountain in the Ortler Alps on the border between South Tyrol and Trentino, Italy. It is the highest peak of Ilmenkamm, a mountain crest in the Ortler Alps and a prominent peak between the Val d'Ultimo and the Deutschnonsberg.

References 
 Hanspaul Menara: Die schönsten 2000er in Südtirol. Athesia, Bozen 2012,  
 Kompass Karten, Ultental – Val Ultimo, Blatt 52, 1:25000

External links 

Mountains of the Alps
Mountains of South Tyrol
Mountains of Trentino
Ortler Alps